Tzvetelina Dobreva (Bulgarian Cyrillic: Цветелина Добрева) (born July 31, 1976), best known by her stage name Tzvetelina (Цветелина), is a Bulgarian pop-folk singer.

Biography 

She was born in Petrich, Bulgaria, but her family soon moved to Varna, where she spent most of her childhood. After grade seven, Tzvetelina attended and graduated from a music high school in Razgrad.
She has two older sisters, Valya and Ekstra Nina, as well as two brothers - Yanek and Dobromir. Aside from her occupation, Tzvetelina's hobbies include skiing and figure skating. On 1 May 2011, she published her first book with positive verses under the title "Fabric for dreamers" (Bulgarian: "Фабрика за мечтатели"), having been inspired by John Kehoe's techniques.

References

External links

Facebook profile

1976 births
Living people
People from Petrich
21st-century Bulgarian women singers
Bulgarian folk-pop singers